Savica Falls is a waterfall in northwestern Slovenia.

A large portion of water is sourced from a karst basin around Black Lake, which lies around  higher above the waterfall, because of which the spring has a relatively steady and strong flow. Water flows to the spring below the ground, where it splits into two parts.

The waterfall continues in a stream of the same name, which flows into Lake Bohinj as its main source.  Water from Lake Bohinj is further a source of the Sava Bohinjka, which forms the Sava River after joining with the Sava Dolinka.

Access
The waterfall is usually accessed from the Savica lodge, accessible from the western part of Lake Bohinj. The waterfall is about a 15-minute walk from the lodge. Is necessary to pay an entrance fee.

Gallery

References

External links

Waterfalls of Slovenia